Matonabbee (–1782) was a Chipewyan hunter and leader. He was also a trader and a Chipewyan representative at the Prince of Wales Fort. He travelled with Chief Akaitcho's older brother, Keskarrah. After his father died, Matonabbee spent some time living at Prince of Wales Fort where he learned to speak English.

On July 14, 1771, while on an Arctic overland journey, he, his followers, and a group of Yellowknives, Dene Suline, also known as Chepewyan, who had joined them at Clowey Lake, massacred a group of over 20 unsuspecting Inuinnait, also known as Copper Inuit; this would be known as the Bloody Falls massacre.

A combination of the deaths of many Chipewyans during a smallpox epidemic of 1782, and the defeat of Fort Prince of Wales by the French in the same year, caused Matonabbee to become depressed. Fort Prince of Wales had been the primary source of his fortune and fame and he had been the main middleman between the various tribes of the Cree and the Hudson's Bay Company. He then committed suicide by hanging himself, thus being the earliest record of a northern First Nations to kill himself.

Literature

References

External links
Samuel Hearne's account of Matonabbee
 
 

1730s births
1782 deaths
18th-century indigenous people of the Americas
Dene people
Canadian explorers
Persons of National Historic Significance (Canada)
Suicides by hanging in Canada
18th-century suicides